|}

The Anthony Mildmay, Peter Cazalet Memorial Chase was a National Hunt handicap chase in England which was open to horses aged five years and older.

It was run at Sandown Park over a distance of 3 miles and 5½ furlongs (5,934 metres), and was scheduled to take place each year in January. The race was named after the Queen Mother's trainer, Peter Cazalet, and his amateur jockey, Anthony Mildmay.

The race was first run in 1952 and was last run under this name in 2000, although the race was also scheduled, but abandoned, in 2001, 2002 and 2003. It was renamed the "Marathon Chase" which in turn was renamed the "London National". It is now held at the December meeting on the same card as the Tingle Creek Chase.

Winners

References

Racing Post:

 Race Recordings 1970–2000 

National Hunt chases
National Hunt races in Great Britain
Sandown Park Racecourse
Discontinued horse races